Kagezi is an administrative Ward within Muhambwe Constituency in Kibondo District of Kigoma Region in Tanzania. 
In 2016 the Tanzania National Bureau of Statistics report there were 9,375 people in the ward.

Before 2014 Kagezi was a village in the Kumsenga Ward.

Villages / neighborhoods 
The ward has 10 hamlets.

 Bisako
 Kagezi
 Kigunga
 Maga
 Mikonko
 Mlange
 Ngoshi
 Nzizi
 Rungarunga
 Shuleni

References

Kibondo District
Wards of Kigoma Region
Constituencies of Tanzania